28978 Ixion (provisional designation ) is a large trans-Neptunian object and a possible dwarf planet. It is located in the Kuiper belt, a region of icy objects orbiting beyond Neptune in the outer Solar System. Ixion is classified as a plutino, a dynamical class of objects in a 2:3 orbital resonance with Neptune. It was discovered in May 2001 by astronomers of the Deep Ecliptic Survey at the Cerro Tololo Inter-American Observatory, and was announced in July 2001. The object is named after the Greek mythological figure Ixion, who was a king of the Lapiths.

In visible light, Ixion appears dark and moderately red in color due to organic compounds covering its surface. Water ice has been suspected to be present on Ixion's surface, but may exist in trace amounts hidden underneath a thick layer of organic compounds. Several astronomers have considered Ixion to be a possible dwarf planet, whereas others consider it a transitional object between irregularly-shaped small Solar System bodies and spherical dwarf planets. Ixion is currently not known to have a natural satellite, so its mass and density remain unknown.

History

Discovery 

Ixion was discovered on 22 May 2001 by a team of American astronomers at the Cerro Tololo Inter-American Observatory in Chile. The discovery formed part of the Deep Ecliptic Survey, a survey conducted by American astronomer Robert Millis to search for Kuiper belt objects located near the ecliptic plane using telescopes at the facilities of the National Optical Astronomy Observatory. On the night of 22 May 2001, American astronomers James Elliot and Lawrence Wasserman identified Ixion in digital images of the southern sky taken with the 4-meter Víctor M. Blanco Telescope at Cerro Tololo. Ixion was first noted by Elliot while compiling two images taken approximately two hours apart, which revealed Ixion's slow motion relative to the background stars. At the time of discovery, Ixion was located in the constellation of Scorpius.

The discoverers of Ixion noted that it appeared relatively bright for a distant object, implying that it might be rather large for a TNO. The discovery supported suggestions that there were undiscovered large trans-Neptunian objects comparable in size to Pluto. Since Ixion's discovery, numerous large trans-Neptunian objects, notably the dwarf planets Haumea, and Makemake, have been discovered; in particular, Eris is almost the same size as Pluto.

The discovery of Ixion was formally announced by the Minor Planet Center in a Minor Planet Electronic Circular on 1 July 2001. It was given the provisional designation , indicating that it was discovered in the second half of May 2001. Ixion was the 1,923rd object discovered in the latter half of May, as indicated by the last letter and numbers in its provisional designation.

At the time of discovery, Ixion was thought to be among the largest trans-Neptunian objects in the Solar System, as implied by its high intrinsic brightness. These characteristics of Ixion prompted follow-up observations in order to ascertain its orbit, which would in turn improve the certainty of later size estimates of Ixion. In August 2001, a team of astronomers used the European Southern Observatory's Astrovirtel virtual observatory to automatically scan through archival precovery photographs obtained from various observatories. The team obtained nine precovery images of Ixion, with the earliest taken by the Siding Spring Observatory on 17 July 1982. These precovery images along with subsequent follow-up observations with the La Silla Observatory's 2.2-meter MPG/ESO telescope in 2001 extended Ixion's observation arc by over 18 years, sufficient for its orbit to be accurately determined and eligible for numbering by the Minor Planet Center. Ixion was given the permanent minor planet number 28978 on 2 September 2001.

Name 

This minor planet is named after the Greek mythological figure Ixion, in accordance with the International Astronomical Union's (IAU's) naming convention which requires plutinos (objects in a 3:2 orbital resonance with Neptune) to be named after mythological figures associated with the underworld. In Greek mythology, Ixion was the king of the legendary Lapiths of Thessaly and had married Dia, a daughter of Deioneus (or Eioneus), whom Ixion promised to give valuable bridal gifts. Ixion invited Deioneus to a banquet but instead pushed him into a pitfall of burning coals and wood, killing Deioneus. Although the lesser gods despised his actions, Zeus pitied Ixion and invited him to a banquet with other gods. Rather than being grateful, Ixion became lustful toward's Zeus's wife, Hera. Zeus found out about his intentions and created the cloud Nephele in the shape of Hera, and tricked Ixion into coupling with it, fathering the race of Centaurs. For his crimes, Ixion was expelled from Olympus, blasted with a thunderbolt, and bound to a burning solar wheel in the underworld for all eternity.

The name for Ixion was suggested by E. K. Elliot, who was also involved in the naming of Kuiper belt object 38083 Rhadamanthus. The naming citation was published by the Minor Planet Center on 28 March 2002.

Planetary symbols are no longer much used in astronomy, so Ixion never received a symbol in the astronomical literature. There is no standard symbol for Ixion used by astrologers either. Sandy Turnbull proposed a symbol for Ixion, which includes the initials I and X as well as depicts the solar wheel that Ixion was bound to in Tartarus. Denis Moskowitz, a software engineer in Massachusetts who designed the symbols for most of the dwarf planets, substitutes the Greek letter iota (Ι) and xi (Ξ) for I and X, creating a variant.

Orbit and rotation 

Ixion is classified as a plutino, or an object that has a 2:3 mean-motion orbital resonance with Neptune. That is, it completes two orbits around the Sun for every three orbits that Neptune takes. At the time of Ixion's discovery, it was initially thought to be in a 3:4 orbital resonance with Neptune, which would have made Ixion closer to the Sun. This is characteristic of all plutinos, which have orbital periods around 250 years and semi-major axes around 39 AU.

Like Pluto, Ixion's orbit is elongated and inclined to the ecliptic. Ixion has an orbital eccentricity of 0.24 and an orbital inclination of 19.6 degrees, slightly greater than Pluto's inclination of 17 degrees. Over the course of its orbit, Ixion's distance from the Sun varies from 30.1 AU at perihelion (closest distance) to 39.8 AU at aphelion (farthest distance). Although Ixion's orbit is similar to that of Pluto, their orbits are oriented differently: Ixion's perihelion is below the ecliptic whereas Pluto's is above it (see right image). , Ixion is approximately 39 AU from the Sun and is currently moving closer, approaching aphelion by 2070. Simulations by the Deep Ecliptic Survey show that Ixion can acquire a perihelion distance (qmin) as small as 27.5 AU over the next 10 million years.

The rotation period of Ixion is uncertain; various photometric measurements suggest that it displays very little variation in brightness, with a small light curve amplitude less than 0.15 magnitudes. Initial attempts to determine Ixion's rotation period were conducted by astronomer Ortiz and colleagues in 2001 but yielded inconclusive results. Although their short-term photometric data was insufficient for Ixion's rotation period to be determined based on its brightness variations, they were able to constrain Ixion's light curve amplitude below 0.15 magnitudes. Astronomers Sheppard and Jewitt obtained similarly inconclusive results in 2003 and provided an amplitude constraint less than 0.05 magnitudes, considerably less than Ortiz's amplitude constraint. In 2010, astronomers Rousselot and Petit observed Ixion with the European Southern Observatory's New Technology Telescope and determined Ixion's rotation period to be  hours, with a light curve amplitude around 0.06 magnitudes. Galiazzo and colleagues obtained a shorter rotation period of  hours in 2016, though they calculated that there is a 1.2% probability that their result may be erroneous.

Physical characteristics

Size and brightness 

Compared to Pluto and its moon Charon, Ixion is less than one-third the diameter of Pluto and three-fifths the diameter of Charon. It was the intrinsically brightest object discovered by the Deep Ecliptic Survey and is among the twenty brightest trans-Neptunian objects known according to astronomer Michael Brown and the Minor Planet Center.

Ixion was the largest and brightest Kuiper belt object found when it was discovered.

They later reevaluated their results in 2003 and realized that their detection of Ixion's thermal emission was spurious; follow-up observations with the IRAM telescope did not detect any thermal emission within the millimeter range at frequencies of 250 GHz, implying a high albedo and consequently a smaller size for Ixion. The lower limit for Ixion's albedo was constrained at 0.15, suggesting that Ixion's diameter did not exceed .

With space-based telescopes such as the Spitzer Space Telescope, astronomers were able to more accurately measure Ixion's thermal emissions, allowing for more accurate estimates of its albedo and size.

On 13 October 2020, Ixion occulted a 10th magnitude red giant star (star Gaia DR2 4056440205544338944), blocking out its light for a duration of approximately 45 seconds. The stellar occultation was observed by astronomers from seven different sites across the western United States. Of the ten participating observers, eight of them reported positive detections of the occultation. Observers from the Lowell Observatory provided highly precise measurements of the occultation chord timing, allowing for tight constraints to Ixion's diameter and possible atmosphere. The precise Lowell Observatory chords place an upper limit surface pressure of <2 microbars for any possible atmosphere of Ixion.

Possible dwarf planet 
Ixion also displays a light curve amplitude less than 0.15 magnitudes, indicative of a likely spheroidal shape, hence why Tancredi considered Ixion as a likely dwarf planet. American astronomer Michael Brown considers Ixion to highly likely be a dwarf planet, placing it at the lower end of the "highly likely" range. Ixion is situated within this size range, suggesting that it is at most only partially differentiated, with a porous internal structure. While Ixion's interior may have collapsed gravitationally, its surface remained uncompressed, implying that Ixion might not be in hydrostatic equilibrium and thus not a dwarf planet. However, this notion for Ixion cannot currently be tested: the object is not currently known to have any natural satellites, and thus Ixion's mass and density cannot currently be measured. Only two attempts with the Hubble Space Telescope have been made to find a satellite within an angular distance of 0.5 arcseconds from Ixion, and it has been suggested that there is a chance as high as 0.5% that a satellite may have been missed in these searches.

Spectra and surface 

The surface of Ixion is very dark and unevolved, resembling those of smaller, primitive Kuiper belt objects such as Arrokoth. In the visible spectrum, Ixion appears moderately red in color, similar to the large Kuiper belt object . Ixion's reflectance spectrum displays a red spectral slope that extends from wavelengths of 0.4 to 0.95 μm, in which it reflects more light at these wavelengths. Longward of 0.85 μm, Ixion's spectrum becomes flat and featureless, especially at near-infrared wavelengths. In the near-infrared, Ixion's reflectance spectrum appears neutral in color and lacks apparent absorption signatures of water ice at wavelengths of 1.5 and 2 μm. Although water ice appears to be absent in Ixion's near-infrared spectrum, Barkume and colleagues have reported a detection of weak absorption signatures of water ice in Ixion's near-infrared spectrum in 2007. Ixion's featureless near-infrared spectrum indicates that its surface is covered with a thick layer of dark organic compounds irradiated by solar radiation and cosmic rays.

The red color of Ixion's surface originates from the irradiation of water- and organic-containing clathrates by solar radiation and cosmic rays, which produces dark, reddish heteropolymers called tholins that cover its surface. The production of tholins on Ixion's surface is responsible for Ixion's red, featureless spectrum as well as its low surface albedo. Ixion's neutral near-infrared color and apparent lack of water ice indicates that it has a thick layer of tholins covering its surface, suggesting that Ixion has undergone long-term irradiation and has not experienced resurfacing by impact events that may otherwise expose water ice underneath. While Ixion is generally known to have a red color, visible and near-infrared observations by the Very Large Telescope (VLT) in 2006 and 2007 paradoxically found a bluer color. This discrepancy was concluded to be an indication of heterogeneities across its surface, which may also explain the conflicting detections of water ice in various studies.
	
In 2003, VLT observations tentatively resolved a weak absorption feature at 0.8 μm in Ixion's spectrum, which could possibly be attributed to surface materials aqueously altered by water. However, it was not confirmed in a follow-up study by Boehnhardt and colleagues in 2004, concluding that the discrepancy between the 2003 and 2004 spectroscopic results may be the result of Ixion's heterogenous surface. In that same study, their results from photometric and polarimetric observations suggest that Ixion's surface consists of a mixture of mostly dark material and a smaller proportion of brighter, icy material. Boehnhardt and colleagues suggested a mixing ratio of 6:1 for dark and bright material as a best-fit model for a geometric albedo of 0.08. Based on combined visible and infrared spectroscopic results, they suggested that Ixion's surface consists of a mixture largely of amorphous carbon and tholins, with the following best-fit model of Ixion's surface composition: 65% amorphous carbon, 20% cometary ice tholins (ice tholin II), 13% nitrogen and methane-rich Titan tholins, and 2% water ice.

In 2005, astronomers Lorin and Rousselot observed Ixion with the VLT in attempt to search for evidence of cometary activity.

Exploration 
The New Horizons spacecraft, which successfully flew by Pluto in 2015, observed Ixion from afar using its long range imager on 13 and 14 July 2016.

In a study published by Ashley Gleaves and colleagues in 2012, Ixion was considered as a potential target for an orbiter mission concept, which would be launched on an Atlas V 551 or Delta IV HLV rocket. For an orbiter mission to Ixion, the spacecraft have a launch date in November 2039 and use a gravity assist from Jupiter, taking 20 to 25 years to arrive. For a flyby mission to Ixion, planetary scientist Amanda Zangari calculated that a spacecraft could take just over 10 years to arrive at Ixion using a Jupiter gravity assist, based on a launch date of 2027 or 2032. Ixion would be approximately 31 to 35 AU from the Sun when the spacecraft arrives. Alternatively, a flyby mission with a later launch date of 2040 would also take just over 10 years, using a Jupiter gravity assist. By the time the spacecraft arrives in 2050, Ixion would be approximately 31 to 32 AU from the Sun. Other trajectories using gravity assists from Jupiter or Saturn have been also considered. A trajectory using gravity assists from Jupiter and Saturn could take under 22 years, based a launch date of 2035 or 2040, whereas a trajectory using one gravity assist from Saturn could take at least 19 years, based on a launch date of 2038 or 2040. Using these alternative trajectories for the spacecraft, Ixion would be approximately 30 AU from the Sun when the spacecraft arrives.

Notes

References

External links 
 Astronomy Picture of the Day–30 August 2001
 Beyond Jupiter: The World of Distant Minor Planets – (28978) Ixion
 

Plutinos
Discoveries by the Deep Ecliptic Survey
Ixion
Possible dwarf planets
Objects observed by stellar occultation
20010522